JDS Teshio (DE-222) was the eighth ship of the s of Japan Maritime Self-Defense Force.

Development and design 
The main anti-submarine (ASW) weapon was changed from the M/50  ASW rocket launcher to the ASROC anti-submarine missile. The octuple launcher for ASROC was stationed at the mid-deck, and the entire ship design was prescribed by this stationing.

Construction and career
Teshio was laid down on 11 July 1973 at Hitachi Zosen Corporation, Maizuru and launched on 29 May 1974. The vessel was commissioned on 10 January 1975 into the 33rd Escort Corps of the Yokosuka District Force.

On April 13, 1999, the 33rd Escort Corps was abolished and transferred to the 21st Escort Corps of the Yokosuka District Force.

Removed from the register on June 27, 2000. The total itinerary during commissioning reached about 430,000 nautical miles and about 20 laps of the earth.

References

1974 ships
Ships built by Hitachi Zosen Corporation
Chikugo-class destroyer escorts